Eberhard Bosslet (born 1953) is a German contemporary artist who has been producing site-specific art and architectural-related works, such as sculpture, installation, light art and painting, all indoors and outdoors, since 1979.

Biography 
Eberhard Bosslet was born in 1953 in Speyer, Germany, He has lived in Berlin and Dresden. 

Bosslet co-founded the artist group, "Material & Effect" (Material & Wirkung) in Berlin in 1981, and since 1980, has been the co-director of the artistspace "MOPEDS" in Berlin/Kreuzberg that is involved in curating and managing non-conventional artshows.

List of works 

 1979: Self-referential works in words and writing-form of painting, photography, wall-drawings, and plates; site-specific interior work with wall-drawings and plates.
 Since 1979:
 Sculptures and installations with electric light and electric steering;
 Performance "Per-/Re-ception" (Wahr-nehmen) in a hall at an industrial yard in Speyer, Germany, using electric installation, electric light, zinc sulfide (phosphorus); photographic details of existing situations in the hall, projected in color or black-and-white negative slides, on the situations themselves.
 1980: Wood panels, coated with colored varnish, and variably arranged in layers.
 Since 1980: Broken glass-panes, site-specific and installation works, as well as paintings with partially colored-coated broken glass, acrylic panes and flexible PVC sheets indoors and outdoors.
 1981: Works with roadway markings and roadblocks.
 1982: "Mobilien & Immobilien" (Movables & Immovables), a series of  photographs, produced with a painted Vespa motor scooter, and colored house facades at Tenerife/Canary Islandes.
 1982 - 84: "Mobiliar" (Furniture), and "Stand der Dinge"  (Status Quo); photographs of interior designs in which the backgrounds and objects were painted.
 Since 1982:
 Series of color photographs at the Canary Islands, Spain;
 Urban exploration: so-called "scrap metal and sun"; Abandoned cars in southern landscape;
 "Interventions" in public space, site specific art,
 1983: Works of rubble at a waste dump.
 1983–2011:
 Works with ruins, so-called "Re/formations and side effects"; here, stabilization and destabilization of perception of conditions of industrial and residential buildings by white painted lines or black painted color fields;
 Side-specific outdoor intervention.

 1985 - 88: Painting — each form complex has its own color and paint material; the "facade ground" is a significantly visible component, and is of equal value as the variables, "form, color, and paint material".
 Since 1985: "Supporting Measures" — indoor, space-related installations and sculptures with items of the building trade; here, new arrangement of space, apparent stabilization and destabilization of the building material and the space itself, by building in structural bodies.

 1986: "Basements" — low, floorplan-like sculptures, with concrete blocks and  copper pipe, or bricks and copper pipe.
 1987 - 1989|89: Sculptures of "Filing Cabinets" with wood, steel strips;  tension and pressure keeps the new order of components stable. 
 Since 1989:
 "Tapestry" of industrial textiles, with no "ground" due to the color-form-material complexes, sewed up next to each other;
 Wall fixtures, varying in type and shape, have a supporting and visual function.
 Since 1989:
 Project drawings for planned sculptures and  installations, computer-generated using a pixel-oriented program, and printed with a 24-needle printer;
 "Pneumatic Pieces" — Free-standing works, with hydraulically  or pneumatically driven lifting devices for inside; "contraptions" made of items from industrial and domestic parts.
 "Pneumatic Installations" — Installed works, with hydraulically  or pneumatically driven lifting devices for both inside and outside;  "contraptions" made of items from industrial and domestic parts.
 1993 - 98:
 "Bilaterale Beziehungen" (Bilateral Relations);
 "Screens": Lattice-structures of rubber- or polyurethane-mounted on both sides of a wall; anchor bars inserted into holes in the walls, helical pressure springs, and anchor nuts have a visual  function and hold the parts together.
 "Gloriolen": cast reliefs, mounted on both sides of a wall, using the same principle as in "Screens", the cast reliefs are held together through anchor bars, helical pressure springs, and anchor nuts that also have a visual function.
 Since 1995: "Barrieren" (Barriers) — foundation-like, knee-high constructions in concrete and steel reinforcement, made on site, designed for the dimensions of the space, and blocking the evident path through the room.
 1998–2001: "Spacelab" — made out of living room lights from the 1950s–1970s, hanging from the ceiling.view]
 Since 2000:
 "Analogic Discs"
 Paintings: Trampolines are the support, which is a constructive and visual  part of the appearance. The support, the form, the material and the color are different, and they are piled on each other.
 Since 2001
 Biomorphic sculptures "Stool Archipelago", "Island growth", "stump stools" are groups of sculptures made of fibreglass plastic on the basis of known organic forms.
 Since 2003
 Colour photo series entitled Falsches Wasser (Fake Water) featuring ships and boats on land in town or countryside settings on the Canary Islands, Spain.
 Since 2006
 EinRaumHaus (OneRoomHouse) colour photo series of small buildings in the landscape of the Canary Islands, Spain.
 Instant sculptures: The sculpture entitled "roundabout" for the public space, consisting of industrial units such as trolleys and fences, which contrary to its conventional use are connected to mega-structures.

Exhibitions

One man shows
 Since 1981: "Interventions" in public space, Antwerp, Barcelona, Canary Islands, Duisburg (Belgium), Spain, Germany.
 1985: "Interventiones", Fundación Miró, Barcelona; Espacio P, Madrid, Spain (catalog).
 1986: Wilhelm-Lehmbruck-Museum, Duisburg, Germany (catalog).
 1987: Heidelberger Kunstverein, Germany (catalog).
 1988:
 February: John Gibson Gallery, New York City, US.
 Mercer Union, Toronto, Canada.
 John Gibson Gallery, September, New York City, US.
 1989:
 Barbara Farber Gallery, Amsterdam, the Netherlands.
 Neue Nationalgalerie Berlin, Germany (catalog).
 Karl Bornstein Gallery, Santa Monica, California, US.
 1990:
 Galerie Le Gall-Peyroulet, Paris, France.
 John Gibson Gallery, New York City, US.
 1991:
 Kunstraum Wuppertal, Germany.
 Galerie Gilles Peyroulet, Paris, France.
 1993:
 Kunsthal Rotterdam, the Netherlands (catalog).
 Sala 1, Rome, Italy (catalog).
 Galerie Blancpain-Stepczynski, Geneva, Switzerland.
 1995:
 Interventionen II, VERBAU, Sprengel Museum Hannover, Germany (catalog).
 PLANEN, Kunstverein Heilbronn, Germany (catalog).
 1998: Fundamental wie Bilateral, Kunsthalle Mannheim, CD-ROM for PC, Germany.
 2000:
 Satellites, Galerie Bochynek, Düsseldorf, Germany.
 Interventions, John Gibson Gallery, New York City, US.
 2002: "Analog Discs", Galerie Bochynek, Düsseldorf, Germany.
 2004:
 Okkupanten, Künstlerhaus Bregenz, Palais Thurn und Taxis, Austria.
Interventionen und Tekko-Tische, Chiara Marzi Gallery, Berlin
 2005: Galerie AT, Barriere, Poznan, Poland
 2006: Galerie der Stadt Backnang (catalog), Germany
 2007: Stadtgalerie Saarbrücken, (catalog), Germany
 2009: Additive, Kunstverein Ingolstadt, CD-ROM-archive with booklet in softbox, Germany
 2010: Humboldt-University Berlin, Thaer-Saal, Berlin, Germany
 2011: Stump stools, Lichthof im Albertinum Dresden, Dresden, Germany
 2012: Dingsda, Saarland Museum, Saarbrücken, Germany
 2014: Chisme-Heavy Duty, TEA Tenerife Espacio de las Artes, Santa Cruz de Tenerife, Spain

Group shows
 1987:
 Bremer Kunstpreis 1987, Kunsthalle Bremen, Germany, (catalog).
 documenta, documenta 8, Kassel, Germany, (catalog).
 1988:
 European sculpture made in USA, John Gibson Gallery, New York City, US (catalog).
 BRD abstract tendencies in new German art, Karl Bornstein Gallery, St. Monica, California, US.
 Spaces 88, Museo d'arte contemporanea Prato, Italy (catalog).
 New Poverty,  MeyersBloom Gallery,  Santa Monica, California, US.
 1989: Intuition, John Gibson Gallery, New York City, US.
 1990:
 Three German Sculptors, Bosslet, Robbe, Staehle, Anthony Ralph Gallery, New York, US.
 Trans-Europe-Express, John Gibson Gallery, New York City, US.
 Non-Sculpture, Barbara Farber Gallery, Amsterdam, the Netherlands.
 The Collection 1988-90, Museo d'arte contemporanea Prato, Italy (catalog).
 1991: Eurocard, John Gibson Gallery, New York City, US.
 1992:
 30th anniversary of Amnesty International, Hótel des arts, Paris, France (catalog).
 Kunst werkt (Art works), Peter Stuyvesant Foundation, Stedelijk Museum Amsterdam, Foundación Miró, Barcelona, Palacio de la Lonja, Zaragoza, Spain (catalog).
 The 1980s, John Gibson Gallery, New York City, US.
 Humpty Dumty's Kaleidoscope: A new generation of German artists, Museum of Contemporary Art Sydney, Australia (catalog).
 Avantgarde Reflex Ost-West, Potsdam, Germany.
 1993:
 Eberhard Bosslet & Lawrence Gipe,  Kunstverein  der Rheinlande und Westfalen, Düsseldorf, Germany (catalog).
 John Gibson Gallery, New York City, US.
 La Laiterie, Amnesty International, Strasbourg, France.
 1994:
 New Furniture for the Villa, Villa  Merkel  Esslingen, Germany.
 Villa Massimo 1988-92, Kunstverein Hannover, Germany.
 1997: The Pleasure of Reading, John Gibson Gallery, New York City.
 1998: Material & Wirkung, Bosslet, Sattel, Klotz, Kunsthaus Dresden, Germany.
 2003: Unexpected selections from the Margulies collection, The Art Museum, Miami, Florida, US (catalog).
 2004:
 WorldWatchers, Kunsthaus Dresden (catalog), Germany
 Konstruktion I Statik, Rüdiger Lange -Loop - Raum für aktuelle Kunst, Berlin, Germany
 2006:
 Faszination Fußball, Pfalzgalerie Kaiserslautern, Catalog, Germany
 Filzfabrik Speyer, Künstlerbund Speyer, Germany
 Das Jahrhundert moderner Skulptur, Wilhelm-Lehmbruck-Museum, Duisburg, Germany
 2007: 1plus aus Dresden, Schloss Waldthausen bei Mainz, Germany
 2008:
 Ostrale 08, Zentrum für zeitgenössische Kunst, Dresden, Germany
 2nd  Bienal de Canarias, Arte, Arquitectura y Paisaje, La Regenta,
Las Palmas Gran Canaria, Canary Islands, Spain
"berufen", Hochschule für Bildende Künste Dresden, Germany
 2009:
 Ostrale 09, Ausstellung internationaler zeitgenössicher Künste, Dresden, Germany
 1st Biennale für Internationale Lichtkunst Ruhr, (Catalog), Curator Matthias Wagner K, Germany
 2010: Liebhaberstücke, Kunstmuseum Mülheim, Germany,
 2011:
 Universum, Temporärer Kunstraum Harkort, Leipzig, Germany
 Kunst in der Villa Körbling, Speyer End of the dream, MicaMoco, Berlin, Germany
 2012:
 Participar, El Matadero, Madrid, Spain
 art claim impulse, Berlin, Germany
 2nd Ural Industrial Biennial of Contemporary Art, Ekaterinburg, Russia (catalog)

Bibliography
 Camps Miro, Teresa und Picazo Gloria: Eberhard Bosslet Intervenciones/Interventionen, Catalog of the Fundación Miró, Barcelona 1985, Spain.
 Stecker, Raimund: documenta 8, Catalog, Germany
 Cameron, Dan: European Sculpture made in U.S.A., Catalog of the John Gibson Gallery, New York City, US 1988.
 Day, Peter: Spaces 88, Catalog of the Museo d'Arte Contemporanea Prato, Italy 1988.
 Rubinstein, Meyer Raphael: Eberhard Bosslet at John Gibson Gallery, in: Flash Art, Summer 1988, p. 136.
 Deckter, Joshua: Eberhard Bosslet at John Gibson Gallery, in: Arts Magazine, December 1988, p. 106.
 Weinstein, Matthew A.: Eberhard Bosslet, John Gibson Gallery, in: Artforum, December 1988, p. 121/122, US.
 Ottmann, Klaus: European Sculpture made in U.S.A., John Gibson Gallery, in: Flash Art, Summer 1988.
 Nieuwenhuyzen, Martijn van: Eberhard Bosslet, Barbara Farber Gallery Amsterdam, in: Flash Art, May/June 1989 p. 125.
 Schmitz, Britta: Eberhard Bosslet, catalog of the Neue Nationalgalerie Berlin, 1989, Germany.
 Kandel, Susan: L.A. in Review, Eberhard Bosslet, Karl Bornstein Gallery, in: Arts Magazine, March 1990, p. 126, US.
 Pagel, David: Eberhard Bosslet, Karl Bornstein Gallery, in: Artscribe, March/April 1990, p. 82.
 Mahoney, Robert: Eberhard Bosslet, John Gibson Gallery, in Arts Magazine, January 1991.
 Murphy, Bernice: in Humpty Dumpty's Kaleidoscope, A New Generation of  German Artists,  catalog of the Museum of  Contemporary  Art, Sydney 1992, p. 17,34,55,58/59. Australia
 Bochynek, Martin: Eberhard Bosslet, Catalog of the Kunsthal Rotterdam 1993, Netherlands.
 Bosslet-Archive (electronic resource), works, essays, reviews 1979–2003; Editor Kunsthalle Mannheim. 3rd Edition, Gallery Version. Dresden, 2003

See also
Site specific art
Environmental sculpture
Environmental art
Installation art
Land Art
Art intervention
Street Art
Light art
List of German painters

External links
 Official Web Site for Eberhard Bosslet
 artnews.org
 artnet.de

German installation artists
20th-century German painters
German male painters
21st-century German painters
21st-century German male artists
People from Speyer
1953 births
Living people
20th-century German sculptors
20th-century German male artists
German male sculptors